"Refill" is a song by American singer-songwriter and R&B recording artist Elle Varner. The song, produced by Andrew "Pop" Wansel, was released on January 31, 2012 as a digital download, and serves as the second single from her debut studio album, Perfectly Imperfect (2012). A snippet of the song was included on her mixtape Conversational Lush (2012). The song received a nomination for Best R&B Song at the 55th Grammy Awards to be held in February 2013. Robert Christgau ranked it number 14 on his year-end singles list for 2012.

Music video
The music video, directed by Constellation Jones, was released March 27, 2012 via Varner's official VEVO account on YouTube. The video features Varner taking a trip to New York City with her cheerleading squad. During her last night in NYC, she sneaks out to explore, running into a man (Jeantique Oriol) who shows her around town. She races back to make the bus, but not before getting his number, which is ripped in half as the bus keeps moving.

Remix
The official remix features Kirko Bangz and T-Pain was released on June 1, 2012. Another remix features Wale and T-Pain. There is also an extended remix made by DJ Unique featuring all 3 rappers.

Chart performance
The song first charted on the week of March 5, 2012 on the Hot R&B/Hip-Hop Songs at number seventy-eight. It has since peaked at number ten.

Charts

Weekly charts

Year-end charts

Release information

Purchasable release

References

2012 singles
2011 songs
RCA Records singles
Songs written by Pop Wansel
Elle Varner songs
Songs written by Elle Varner